Téodoro Capriles (born 17 February 1945) is a Venezuelan former swimmer. He competed in two events at the 1964 Summer Olympics.

References

External links
 

1945 births
Living people
Venezuelan male swimmers
Olympic swimmers of Venezuela
Swimmers at the 1964 Summer Olympics
Swimmers at the 1963 Pan American Games
Swimmers at the 1967 Pan American Games
Pan American Games competitors for Venezuela
Place of birth missing (living people)
20th-century Venezuelan people
21st-century Venezuelan people